The 1991–92 Icelandic Hockey League season was the inaugural season of the top level ice hockey league of Iceland. Skautafelag Akureyrar won the inaugural championship.

External links
Icelandic Ice Hockey Federation

Icelandic Hockey League
Icelandic Hockey League seasons
1991–92 in Icelandic ice hockey
1992 in Icelandic sport